() is the rank usually held by Non-commissioned officers in some East Asian militaries. The ranks are used in both the People's Republic of China and the Republic of China or Taiwan, and both North and South Korea. The rank name is based on the on one of the four ancient occupations.

Chinese variant

People's Liberation Army 

Republic of China Armed Forces

Korean variant

North Korea

South Korea

See also

 Wei (rank)
 Jiang (rank)
 Xiao (rank)
 Ranks of the People's Liberation Army Ground Force
 Ranks of the People's Liberation Army Navy
 Ranks of the People's Liberation Army Air Force
 Republic of China Armed Forces rank insignia

References

Military ranks of the People's Republic of China
Military of the Republic of China